Porozovo may refer to:
 Porozovo, Ivanovo Oblast
 Porozovo, Udmurtia